Norman Mark Reedus (born January 6, 1969) is an American actor best known for starring as Daryl Dixon in the AMC horror drama series The Walking Dead (2010–2022). He also starred as Murphy MacManus in the film The Boondock Saints (1999) and its sequel The Boondock Saints II: All Saints Day (2009), Scud in Marvel's Blade II (2002), Marco in Deuces Wild (2002), and himself in his AMC TV show Ride with Norman Reedus (2016–2021). He has acted in numerous films and television series, and modeled for various fashion designers (including Prada in the 1990s). Reedus also provided motion capture and voice acting for the lead character Sam Porter in the video game Death Stranding (2019).

Early life
Reedus was born in Hollywood, Florida, the son of Marianne (née Yarber), a teacher, and Ira Norman Reedus. Reedus's paternal grandmother was of Italian descent, while his grandfather had English, Scottish, and Irish ancestry. He attended Bethany College in Lindsborg, Kansas, for a semester. After living in Tokyo, he moved to California to work at a Harley-Davidson shop in Venice, California, and contributed artwork to various shows as a painter, photographer, sculptor, and video artist. He first acted in the play Maps for Drowners at the Tiffany Theater on Sunset Boulevard. He was discovered at a bar in downtown Hollywood, singing and dancing where someone asked him if he wanted to act in a play.

Career

Film and television

Reedus played Jeremy in his major film debut Mimic and Mac in Giovanni Rodriguez's Red Canyon. He played Murphy MacManus in the 1999 film The Boondock Saints. He reprised the role in the 2009 sequel The Boondock Saints II: All Saints Day. He played Scud in Blade II. He guest-starred in Charmed as Nate, the boyfriend of Paige (Rose McGowan). Reedus starred in Hello Herman, which opened nationwide and on-demand on June 7, 2013. Reedus stars in the reality series Ride with Norman Reedus, which premiered in June 2016. Most recently, he started Bigbaldhead Productions with an overall deal at AMC.

The Walking Dead
In 2010, Reedus began playing Daryl Dixon in the AMC television series The Walking Dead, a horror drama about a group of friends and family members who fight to survive in a violent apocalyptic world populated with flesh-eating zombies and the few surviving humans. The character was not originally in the comic book series of the same name, but was created specifically for Reedus after his audition for the character of Merle Dixon. The Walking Dead comic creator Robert Kirkman feels "absolutely blessed Reedus has honored the show with his presence, and the way he has come in and taken over that role and defined Daryl Dixon. A lot of Reedus's portrayal of the character in the first season inspired all the writers to do what we did with him in the second season. We love writing him and end up doing cool stuff with him." The drama has evolved into the highest-rated in cable history, smashing all previous records. Reedus was nominated for a Saturn Award for Best Supporting Actor for his performance.

Reedus will reprise his role of Daryl as the lead of a spin-off series centered on his character, following the conclusion of the 11th and final season of The Walking Dead. Angela Kang will be the showrunner for the series, which is set to debut in 2023.

Modeling, music videos, and art
Reedus has modeled for Prada, Alessandro Dell'Acqua, Durban, Levi's, Lexus, and Morgenthal Fredrics. In 2015, Reedus posed for a Cruelty Free International advertisement in support of ending cosmetic tests on animals.

In the mid-1990s, while working as a model, he appeared in the music videos for "Wicked as It Seems" by Keith Richards, "Violently Happy" by Björk, "Flat Top" by Goo Goo Dolls, "Cat's in the Cradle" covered by Ugly Kid Joe, "Strange Currencies" by R.E.M., and "Fake Plastic Trees" by Radiohead. In 1999, he appeared in the video for "Mean to Me" by Tonic. Since achieving fame as an actor, he has also appeared in the videos for "Judas" by Lady Gaga, "Sun Down" by Tricky (feat. Tirzah), "Gypsy Woman" by Hilary Duff, "No Cities to Love" by Sleater-Kinney, and "Curse of the Blackened Eye" by Orville Peck.

He is also a painter, sculptor, and photographer, who has shown his artwork in galleries in New York City, Berlin, and Frankfurt. He released a book of photography on October 31, 2013, called The Sun's Coming Up... Like a Big Bald Head, and in September 2014 announced a fan-art compilation called Thanks for All the Niceness.

Video games
Reedus reprised his role as Daryl Dixon in the 2013 video game The Walking Dead: Survival Instinct, which is based on the television series. He was set to star in Hideo Kojima and Guillermo del Toro's reboot horror game Silent Hills, but Kojima left Konami and the game was canceled in 2015. Reedus starred in Kojima's video game Death Stranding.

Personal life
Reedus was in a five-year relationship with supermodel Helena Christensen from 1998 to 2003. Despite reports to the contrary, the two were never married. Together they have a son, born in 1999. They have remained friends and shared joint custody of their son.

In February 2005, Reedus sustained a head injury when a truck collided with his car in Germany. His nose was reconstructed with the aid of four screws and his left eye socket with titanium.

In 2015, during the filming of Sky, Reedus met German actress Diane Kruger; the two were first seen together as a couple in July 2016. In November 2018, Kruger gave birth to their daughter, Nova; his second and her first child.

Filmography

Film

Television

Video games

Music videos

Awards and nominations

References

External links

 
 

1969 births
Living people
American people of Italian descent
American people of English descent
American people of Scottish descent
American people of Irish descent
American people of Scotch-Irish descent
American male film actors
American male television actors
American male video game actors
American male voice actors
Male models from Florida
Male actors from Florida
People from Hollywood, Florida
American emigrants to Ireland
American emigrants to Spain
American emigrants to Japan
20th-century American male actors
21st-century American male actors